The 2013 Italian motorcycle Grand Prix was the fifth round of the 2013 MotoGP season. It was held at the Mugello Circuit in Scarperia on 2 June 2013.

Jorge Lorenzo took the victory, ahead of pole sitter Dani Pedrosa, and Cal Crutchlow. Valentino Rossi and Álvaro Bautista collided on lap 1, the barriers being torn apart on impact, and Marc Márquez slid wide into the gravel trap with 3 laps to go, suffering his first MotoGP retirement, whilst riding in a comfortable second place.

Classification

MotoGP

Moto2

Moto3

Championship standings after the race (MotoGP)
Below are the standings for the top five riders and constructors after round five has concluded.

Riders' Championship standings

Constructors' Championship standings

 Note: Only the top five positions are included for both sets of standings.

References

Italian motorcycle Grand Prix
Italian
Motorcycle Grand Prix
Italian motorcycle Grand Prix